Murilo Araújo Rosa (born 21 August 1970) is a Brazilian actor.

Personal life 

Married to Brazilian supermodel Fernanda Tavares on July 28, 2007, at Our Lady of the Rosary Church, in Goiás, the same church that his grandparents and his parents, the lawyer Odair Domingos Rosa and professor Maria Luíza Araújo Rosa, married. With her two children, Lucas, born in 2007 and Artur born in 2012.

He is a black belt in Taekwondo and before becoming an actor, when he was still an athlete, he won two world championships in his category. He currently serves as the ambassador of taekwondo in Brazil, and even played a Taekwondo master in one of Brazil's most prolific soap operas, Malhação.

Filmography

Television

Film

References

External links 

1970 births
Living people
Male actors from Brasília
Brazilian male taekwondo practitioners
Brazilian male television actors
Brazilian male telenovela actors
Brazilian male film actors
Brazilian male stage actors
Brazilian Roman Catholics